Roulette Records was an American record company and label founded in 1957 by George Goldner, Joe Kolsky, Morris Levy and Phil Kahl, with creative control given to producers and songwriters Hugo Peretti and Luigi Creatore. Levy was appointed director.

The label had known ties to New York City mobsters. Levy ran the label with an iron fist. In 1958 Roost Records was purchased. Goldner subsequently bowed out of his partnership interest in Roulette and, to cover his gambling debts, sold his record labels Tico, Rama, Gee and—years later—End and Gone to Levy, who grouped them into Roulette. Peretti and Creatore later left Roulette and worked as freelance producers for RCA Records throughout the 1960s. They co-founded Avco Records in 1969. In 1971 Roulette took over the catalog of Jubilee Records.

History
During the late 1950s, Roulette scored hits by Buddy Knox, Jimmy Bowen, The Playmates, Jimmie Rodgers, Ronnie Hawkins and The Delicates as well as releasing albums by Pearl Bailey, Dinah Washington and Count Basie.

During the early 1960s, Roulette issued recordings connected to the twist dance craze, such as "Peppermint Twist" by Joey Dee and the Starliters. They also released a rare album of "twist songs" by Bill Haley & His Comets, Twistin' Knights at the Roundtable. Other major 1960s hits for the label include "Two Faces Have I" by Lou Christie. A group of United States Marines called The Essex recorded the hit "Easier Said Than Done" while based at Camp Lejeune, NC, in 1963. In 1964, Stephen Stills and Richie Furay first recorded together on Roulette while in the nine-member Au Go Go Singers, the house band for the Cafe Au Go Go in New York City.

In the UK Roulette's records were issued on EMI's Columbia label. In April 1965, the UK music magazine NME reported that Roulette had agreed to offer a sponsored show to the UK pirate radio radio station Radio Caroline. The hour-long show, recorded in the US by disc jockey Jack Spector, was to be broadcast five evenings a week. The contract covered a two-year period and was worth over £10,000 to the station.

According to Tommy James of Tommy James and the Shondells, whose "Hanky Panky", "I Think We're Alone Now", "Mirage", "Mony Mony", "Crimson and Clover" and many others were released during his time at the label, Roulette was a front business for the Genovese crime family. James estimates that the label kept $30 million-$40 million of the group's royalties but afforded it total artistic freedom, whereas another label would have tampered with its formula and might have dropped the group early on. Throughout the 1960s and 1970s, Roulette was one of the industry's major distributors, handling records for many leading labels.

Levy was the key financial backer for the rap music label Sugar Hill Records, which was founded in 1974 by the husband-and-wife team Joe and Sylvia Robinson. Sugar Hill released the first Top 40 rap single, "Rapper's Delight", in 1979. In the early 1980s, the Robinsons bought Levy out.

In 1981, Henry Stone turned to Levy to help prevent the demise of TK Records, so they set up Sunnyview Records under the Roulette umbrella. In 1986, Levy was arrested, tried and convicted for extorting money from an FBI informant, John LaMonte, but he died in Ghent, New York, before serving any time in prison. In 1989, Roulette Records was sold to a consortium of EMI and Rhino Records, the latter of which was later acquired by Warner Music Group. Rhino would control Roulette’s pop catalogue in the USA, Canada and Mexico, while EMI acquired Roulette’s jazz catalogue worldwide, plus the international distribution of Roulette’s pop catalogue. As of 2013, Warner Music Group now has worldwide rights to the Roulette catalogue as a result of acquiring EMI’s Parlophone label.

Following their 1989 acquisition, Rhino and EMI began issuing large royalty checks to former Roulette artists. Tommy James recalled that his checks were in amounts in six or seven digits. Roulette was notorious for not paying royalties to its artists, who had to rely on concerts and personal appearances for their income.

Until 2013, EMI used the Roulette name for the reissue of old Roulette-label material. In the US, Blue Note Records handled the Roulette jazz catalogue for release on the Roulette Jazz label until 2013. It was one of the units of Parlophone that Universal Music was required to sell to Warner Music Group to comply with international regulators.

Roulette Records artists

Alive N Kickin'
Louis Armstrong
Arzachel (US and Canada)
Au Go Go Singers
Pearl Bailey
The Barry Sisters
Count Basie
Jimmy Bowen
Joanne Campbell
Cathy Carr
Betty Carter
Marilyn Chambers
The Choir
Lou Christie
Dave "Baby" Cortez
Sammy Davis, Jr.

Joey Dee and the Starliters
The Delicates
The Detergents
The Devotions
Tom Rizzi
Ecstasy, Passion & Pain
Duane Eddy
Harry "Sweets" Edison
The Essex
Maynard Ferguson
Bill Haley & His Comets
Herman's Hermits
Ronnie Hawkins
The Hullaballoos
Tommy James
Tommy James & the Shondells
Truth

 Jackie Kannon
Buddy Knox
Frankie Lymon
Machito
Deidre McCalla
Lou Monte
Jim Neske (aka, Chance Eden)
The Playmates
The Rock-A-Teens
Jimmie Rodgers
Jeri Southern
The Teenagers
The Three Degrees
Sarah Vaughan
Dinah Washington
Joe Williams
Eddie Palmieri 
Chuck Wood

Discography

25000 Popular Series
Roulette Records 25000 Popular Series of LP records began in 1957 and ran until 1968.

42000 Pop series

3000 Pop Series

Birdland Jazz Series
The Roulette 52000 Birdland Series of 12 inch LPs commenced in 1958 and consists of 124 album releases over 10 years.

5000 Jazz Series

2-LP Birdland Series

500 Comedy Series

800 Soundtrack Series
All of the soundtracks in this series were for films released in the United States during 1966.

80000 Original Cast Series

10 Original Cast Series

100 Echoes Series
Reissue series from used by the label during 1973. Not all these albums have "Echoes of An Era" somewhere in the title - some do, some don't. They are two-album sets.

59000 Original Rock N' Roll Hits Series
This was the label's final effort at repackaging its old recordings.

9000 African Series
These albums, which were acquired by Roulette for U.S. distribution, were recorded in the continent of Africa.

65000 International Series

75000 Classical Series

100 Demo Series

See also
 Lists of record labels

References

American record labels
1956 establishments in New York (state)
1989 disestablishments in New York (state)
Record labels established in 1956
Record labels disestablished in 1989
Jazz record labels
Pop record labels
Rhythm and blues record labels
Rock record labels
EMI
Warner Music Group